This list contains weapons that are classified as crew-served, as the term is used in the United States military.

While the general understanding is that crew-served weapons require more than one person to operate them, there are important exceptions in the case of both squad automatic weapons (SAW) and sniper rifles.  Within the table of organization and equipment for both the United States Army and the U.S. Marine Corps, these two classes of weapons are understood to be crew-served, as the operator of the weapon (identified as a marksman or as a SAW gunner) has an assistant, who carries additional ammunition and associated equipment, acts as a spotter, and is also fully qualified in the operation of the weapon.

Light and medium machine guns

In active service

Light machine guns 
M249 SAW (Squad Automatic Weapon) (5.56×45mm NATO)

General purpose machine guns 
M240B/M240E4 (7.62×51mm NATO)
M240G (7.62×51mm NATO) (USMC)

In active service (some branches, secondary or limited roles)

Light machine guns 
M27 IAR (Infantry Automatic Rifle) (5.56×45mm) (USMC)
Mk 46 Mod 1 (5.56×45mm NATO) (USSOCOM)

General purpose machine guns 
M240D/M240E1 and M240H/M240E5 (Vehicle Mountable) (7.62×51mm NATO)
M240L/M240E6 (7.62×51mm NATO) (US Army)
M60D (Vehicle Mountable) (7.62×51mm NATO) (USN)
M60E3 (7.62×51mm NATO) (USN SEALs)
M60E4/Mk 43 Mod 0/1 (7.62×51mm NATO) (USN)
Mk 48 Mod 0/1 (7.62×51mm NATO) (USSOCOM)
MG 338 (.338 Norma Magnum) (USSOCOM)

Out of service
HK21 (7.62×51mm NATO, Delta Force, Combat Controllers(CCT) and SEALs only)
XM8 LMG (5.56×45mm NATO) 
EX 27 Mod 0 (Colt CMG-2; 5.56×45mm)
WAK 'Interim SAW (5.56×45mm)
XM106 (5.56×45mm)
XM262 (HK 21E variant, pre-HK 23E; 5.56×45mm)
XM234 (6x45mm, 5.56×45mm)
XM233 (6x45mm)
XM235/XM248 (6x45mm, 5.56×45mm)
XM223
CAR-15 HBAR (M1 and M2, 5.56×45mm) 
T161 (7.62×51mm NATO)
T52 (7.62×51mm NATO)
T44 (.30-06)
T24 (.30-06)
T10/T23 (.30-06)
M1918A1/A2 BAR (.30-06)
M1922 BAR (.30-06)
Johnson M1941 LMG (.30-06, Rangers and Special Operations Forces only)
M14A1 (7.62×51mm NATO)
M15 (7.62×51mm NATO)
M16A1 with bipod (5.56×45mm NATO)
XM207/E1/Mk 23 Mod 0 (Stoner 63A1 'Commando'; 5.56×45mm NATO)
M1919A6 (.30-06) 
Lewis Gun (.30-06, Army only)
Chauchat (.30-06, 8 mm Lebel)
M1909 Benét–Mercié (Machine Rifle, (.30-06))

Experimental
Mk48 Mod 2
AAI Corporation LSAT (Lightweight Small Arms Technologies) LMG (5.56 mm Composite-cased, Telescoping Ammunition)
Knight's Armament Company LAMG
FN EVOLYS
Sig Sauer MG 6.8 (SiG 6.8 mm Fury hybrid round)
General Dynamics RM277 (True Velocity .277 TVCM polimer cased round)
Next Generation Squad Weapon - Automatic Rifle
Lightweight Medium Machine Gun (Medium Machine Gun) (.338 Norma Magnum)

Marksman, sniper and anti-materiel rifles

In active service (some branches, secondary or limited roles)

Designated marksman rifle 
SEAL Recon Rifle (5.56×45mm NATO) (USN SEALs)
M16 SDMR (Squad Designated Marksman Rifle) (5.56×45mm NATO) (US Army)
Mk 12 Mod 0/1 SPR (Special Purpose Rifle) (5.56×45mm NATO) (USSOCOM)
M38 SDMR (Squad Designated Marksman Rifle) (5.56×45mm NATO) (USMC Designated Marksmen)
M39 EMR (Enhanced Marksman Rifle) (7.62×51mm NATO) (USMC)
M21A5/M14SE Crazy Horse (7.62×51mm NATO) (US Army and USN)
M25 SWS (Sniper Weapon System) (7.62×51mm NATO) (USSOCOM)
M14 Tactical Rifle (7.62×51mm NATO) (USCG)

Bolt action sniper rifle 
M40A3/A5 (7.62×51mm NATO) (USMC)
M2010 ESR (Enhanced Sniper Rifle) (.300 Winchester Magnum) (US Army)
Mk 13 Mod 5 AWM (Arctic Warfare Magnum) (.300 Winchester Magnum)
Mk 21 Mod 0 PSR (Precision Sniper Rifle) (USSOCOM)
Mk 22 ASR (Advanced Sniper Rifle) (USSOCOM)

Semi-automatic sniper rifle 
Mk 11 Mod 0/1/2 SWS (Sniper Weapon System) (7.62×51mm NATO)
M110 SASS (Semi-Automatic Sniper System) (7.62×51mm NATO)
Mk 14 Mod 0/1 EBR (Enhanced Battle Rifle) (7.62×51mm NATO) (USN SEALs, US Army and USCG)
M110A1 CSASS (Compact Semi-Automatic Sniper System) (7.62x51 NATO, 6.5 Creedmoore) (US Army, USMC) 
M110K1 SASS (7.62x51 NATO, 6.5 Creedmoore) (US Navy Designated Marksman) 
Mk 20 Mod 0 SSR (Sniper Support Rifle) (7.62×51mm NATO, 6.5 Creedmoor) (USSOCOM)

Anti-materiel rifle 
M82A1M/A3 (Anti-Materiel rifle) (.50 BMG)
M107 (Anti-Materiel rifle) (.50 BMG)
Mk 15 Mod 0 LRSW (Long-Range Sniper Weapon) (Bolt Action Anti-Materiel Rifle) (.50 BMG) (USN SEALs)

Out of service

Designated marksman rifles 
USMC Squad Advanced Marksman Rifle (SAM-R) (Designated Marksman Rifle) (5.56×45mm NATO)
USMC Designated Marksman Rifle (DMR) (Designated Marksman Rifle) (7.62×51mm NATO)
XM8 Sharpshooter (5.56×45mm NATO)
Colt Model 655/656 (Selective Fire Marksman Rifle) (5.56×45mm NATO) (Never Standardized)
EX 16 Mod 0 SCAR-L (SV) (Semi-Auto Rifle) (5.56×45mm NATO)
M1C/D Garand (Semi-Automatic Rifle) (.30-06)

Semi-automatic sniper rifles 
Mk 11 Mod 1 (Semi-Automatic Sniper Rifle) (7.62×51mm NATO)
EX 17 Mod 0 SCAR-H (SV) (Semi-Automatic Rifle) (7.62×51mm NATO)
M21 Sniper Weapon System (Semi-Automatic Sniper Rifle) (7.62×51mm NATO)
M25 Sniper Weapon System (Semi-Automatic Sniper Rifle) (7.62×51mm NATO)

Bolt action sniper rifles 
M24 Sniper Weapon System (Bolt Action Sniper Rifle) (7.62×51mm NATO)
M40 (Bolt Action Sniper Rifle) (7.62×51mm NATO)
M40A1 (Bolt Action Sniper Rifle) (7.62×51mm NATO)
M86 (USN SEALs)
M1903A4 (Bolt Action Sniper Rifle) (.30-06)
Winchester Model 70 (Bolt-Action Rifle) (.30-06)

Anti-materiel rifle 
M82A1/A1A (Semi-Automatic Anti-Materiel Rifle) (.50 BMG)
M82A2 (Semi-Automatic Anti-Materiel Rifle) (.50 BMG)
Robar RC-50 (Bolt-Action Anti-Materiel Rifle) (.50 BMG)

Random 
Sharps Rifle (Lever-Action Rifle) (.50-90 Sharps)
Whitworth rifle (Single-Shot Muzzle-Loaded Rifle) (.451)

Experimental
M110 CSASS (Compact Semi-Automatic Sniper System) (Designated Marksman Rifle) (7.62×51mm NATO)
MRGG (Mid-Range Gas Gun) (6.5mm Creedmoor) (USSOCOM)
Mk 17 Mod 1 (FN SCAR-H) (6.5mm Creedmoor) (USSOCOM)
LMT MARS-H 6.5 DMR (6.5mm Creedmoor) (USSOCOM)
LaRue Tactical PredatOBR 6.5 Creedmoor (6.5mm Creedmoor) (USSOCOM)
XM109 (Semi-Automatic Anti-materiel rifle) (25×59 mm) 
XM500 (Bullpup Semi-Automatic Anti-materiel rifle ) (.50 BMG)

Machine guns, automatic grenade launchers, and automatic cannons

In active service

Light machine guns 
M249 Family (Light Machine Gun) (5.56×45mm NATO)
M27 IAR (Infantry Automatic Rifle) (5.56×45mm) (USMC)

Medium machine guns 
M60 Family (Medium Machine Gun) (7.62×51mm NATO)
M240 Family (Medium Machine Gun) (7.62×51mm NATO)
M134D/GAU-17/A (Rotary-Barreled Medium Machine Gun) (7.62×51mm NATO)
MG 338 (.338 Norma Magnum) (USSOCOM)

Heavy machine guns 
M2HB/M2A1 (Heavy Machine Gun) (Vehicle and Infantry) (.50 BMG)
GAU-15/A/GAU-16/A/GAU-18/A (Heavy Machine Gun) (Helicopter Door Mounted) (.50 BMG)
GAU-21/A (M3M/P) (Heavy Machine Gun) (Helicopter Door Mounted-Faster Firing) (.50 BMG)
GAU-19/A/B (Rotary-Barreled Heavy Machine Gun) (.50 BMG)

Automatic cannons 
M61A1/A2 Vulcan/Mk 15 CIWS (Rotary-Barreled Automatic Cannon) (20×102mm) (USAF: F-15C/D, F-15E, F-16C/D, F-22A) (USN: F/A-18A/B/C/D, F/A-18E/F, Nimitz, Ford, Wasp, America, Ticonderoga, Arleigh Burke, Oliver Hazard Perry, Whidbey Island, Harpers Ferry) (USMC: F/A-18A/C/D) (USCG: Hamilton, Legend)
M197 (Rotary-Barreled Automatic Cannon) (20×102mm) (USMC: AH-1W, AH-1Z) 
GAU-12/U Equalizer (Rotary Barreled Automatic Cannon) (25×137mm) (USAF: AC-130U) (USMC: AV-8B) 
GAU-22/A Equalizer (Rotary Barreled Automatic Cannon) (25×137mm) (USAF: F-35A) (USMC: F-35B) (USN: F-35C)
M242/Mk 38 Mod 0/2/3 Bushmaster II (Automatic Cannon) (25×137mm) (US Army: Stryker, M2/M3/M6/M7 Bradley) (USMC: LAV-25) (USN: Wasp, Ticonderoga, Arleigh Burke, Oliver Hazard Perry, Cyclone, San Antonio, Whidbey Island, Harpers Ferry) (USCG: Island, Hamilton, Sentinel, USCGC Alex Haley (WMEC-39))
Mk 44 Mod 0/GAU-23/A/Mk 46 Mod 2 Bushmaster II (Automatic Cannon) (30×173mm)  (USAF: AC-130W, AC-130J) (USN: Zumwalt, Independence, Freedom)
GAU-8/A Avenger (Rotary Barreled Automatic Cannon) (30×173mm) (USAF: A-10C)
M230 (Automatic Cannon) (30×113mm) (US Army: AH-64D/E, MH-60L, AH-6M)
L/60 Bofors (Automatic Cannon) (40x311mm) (USAF: AC-130U)

Automatic grenade launchers 
Mk 19 Mod 3 (Automatic Grenade Launcher) (40×53mm) (US Army, USAF, USN, USMC, USCG, USSOCOM)
Mk 47 Mod 0 Stryker (Automatic Grenade Launcher) (40×53mm) (USSOCOM)

Out of service

Light machine guns 
XM214 (Rotary-Barreled Machine Gun) (5.56×45mm NATO)

Medium machine guns 
EX 34 Mod 0 (Chain-driven Machine Gun, 7.62×51mm NATO)
M73/A1 (Co-axial Machine Gun, 7.62×51mm NATO)
M219 (Co-axial Machine Gun, 7.62×51mm NATO)
M1917 (Heavy Machine Gun, .30-06 Springfield)
M1919 Family (including Mk 21 Mod 0/1) (Medium Machine Gun, .30-06 Springfield and 7.62×51mm NATO)
Colt–Browning M1895/1917

Heavy machine guns 
M85/M85C (Heavy Machine Gun) (.50 BMG)
XM312 (Heavy Machine Gun) (.50 BMG)
XM806 (Lightweight Heavy Machine Gun) (.50 BMG) (US Army)

Automatic cannons 
M1/AN/M2/M3/M24 (Automatic Cannon, 20×110mm USN)
Mk 16 Mod 4/5 (Automatic Cannon, 20×110mm USN; deck mount versions of the M3 and M24)
M39A1/A2/A3 (Automatic Cannon, 20×102mm; based on the Mauser MG 213C Cannon)
Mk 11 Mod 0/5 (Twin-Barrel Automatic Cannon, 20×110mm USN)
Mk 12 Mod 0 (Automatic Cannon, 20×110mm USN)
M195 (Rotary-Barreled Automatic Cannon, 20×102mm)
M140/E3/E5 (Automatic Cannon, 30×100mm)
M188/E1 (Automatic Cannon, 30×113mm)
Marlin machine gun

Automatic grenade launchers 
XM307 (Grenade machine gun, 25 mm HV Airburst)
M75/M129 (Automatic Grenade Launcher, 40×53mm)
M174 grenade launcher (Automatic Grenade Launcher, 40×46mm)
M175 grenade launcher (Automatic Grenade Launcher, 40×53mm)
Mk 18 Mod 0 grenade launcher (Manually Operated, Belt-Fed Grenade Launcher, 40×46mm)
Mk 20 Mod 0 (Automatic Grenade Launcher, 40×46mm)

Experimental
Mk48 Mod 2
NGSW-AR
Knight's Armament Company LAMG
LSAT light machine gun
FN EVOLYS
XM250
Lightweight Medium Machine Gun (Medium Machine Gun) (.338 Norma Magnum)

Missile launchers

In active service
FIM-92 Stinger (surface-to-air missile) (70 mm)
FGM-148 Javelin (anti-tank missile) (127 mm) 
BGM-71 TOW (Tube-launched Optically tracked Wire-guided) (anti-tank missile) (152mm)

In active service (some branches, secondary or limited roles)
Mk 153 Mod 0/2 SMAW (Shoulder-launched Multipurpose Assault Weapon) (anti-fortification, anti-armor rocket) (83.5 mm) (USMC)

Out of service
FIM-43 Redeye
M47 Dragon

Recoilless rifles

In active service
M3 MAAWS (Multi-role Anti-armor Anti-tank Weapon System) (anti-fortification, anti-armor recoilless rifle) (84 mm)

Out of service
M67 recoilless rifle (90 mm)
M18 recoilless rifle (57 mm)
M20 recoilless rifle (75 mm)
M27 recoilless rifle (105 mm, developed into M40)
M40 recoilless rifle  (105 mm, called 106 mm to forestall use of incompatible M27 ammunition)

Mortars

In active service
M120 120 mm mortar/M121 120 mm mortar (Army)
M224 60 mm mortar
M252 81 mm mortar
M327 EFSS (USMC)
Cardom (Army)

Out of service
M1 Mortar (81 mm)
M2 Mortar (60 mm)
M19 Mortar (60 mm)
M29 Mortar (81 mm)
M30 107 mm Mortar
Mk 2 Mod 0/1 (Breech-loaded Mortar, 81 mm)

Experimental
Dragon Fire 120 mm automated mortar
MFSS 120 mm mortar

Artillery

In active service
M119 (105 mm Towed Howitzer)
M777 (155 mm Towed Howitzer)

In active service (some branches, secondary or limited roles)
M102 (105 mm Towed Howitzer) (used on USAF AC-130 gunships)

Out of service
M59 (155 mm Field Gun)
M114/A1 (155 mm Towed Howitzer)
M1/M115 (203 mm/8" Towed Howitzer) 
M110 (203 mm/8" Self-Propelled Howitzer) 
M1902 (76.2mm/3" Field Gun)
M101/A1 (105 mm Towed Howitzer)
3 inch Gun M5
M116 (75 mm Pack Howitzer)
M198 (155 mm Towed Howitzer)

Munitions systems

In active service
M7 Spider

Experimental
XM1100 Scorpion

Mine dispenser

In active service
M139 Volcano

Out of service
M128 GEMSS

Mine-clearing systems

In active service
APOBS Mk 7 Mod 2
M58 Mine Clearing Line Charge 
MK155 Mine Clearance Launcher

See also
List of U.S. Army weapons by supply catalog designation
List of firearms
List of individual weapons of the U.S. Armed Forces
United States hand grenades
List of vehicles of the U.S. Armed Forces
List of weapons of the U.S. Marine Corps
definition of crew-served weapon

References

Crew served (United States)
United States